Héctor García Otero (June 12, 1926 – before 2004) was an Uruguayan basketball player, who twice won the bronze medal with the men's national team at the Summer Olympics: in 1952 and 1956.

References

External links

1926 births
Year of death missing
Basketball players at the 1948 Summer Olympics
Basketball players at the 1952 Summer Olympics
Basketball players at the 1956 Summer Olympics
Olympic basketball players of Uruguay
Olympic bronze medalists for Uruguay
Uruguayan men's basketball players
1959 FIBA World Championship players
Place of birth missing
Olympic medalists in basketball
Medalists at the 1956 Summer Olympics
Medalists at the 1952 Summer Olympics
1954 FIBA World Championship players